Heather Scott is an American biologist, businesswoman, and far-right politician serving as a Republican member of the Idaho House of Representatives from the 1st district.

Early life and education
Born in Ohio, Scott earned a Bachelor of Arts degree in biology from the University of Akron.

Career 
She was employed in the field of fisheries and aquatic biology for over 15 years related to the Federal Energy Regulatory Commission re-licensing and operations of hydroelectric facilities.

Idaho House of Representatives 
In 2015 Scott is reported to have cut wires which were part of the fire-suppression system in her office. Scott believed at the time that the wires were in fact listening devices planted to spy on her. The wire-cutting incident was witnessed by other Idaho House members.

In August 2017, Scott defended white nationalism on her Facebook page. She reportedly said, "The way the media has set this up, the mention of white nationalist, which is no more than a Caucasian who (sic) for the Constitution and making America great again, and confusing it with term, 'white supremacist' which is extreme racism. Therefore, if one is 'guilty' of being white, one is clearly racist."

At the start of the 2017 legislative session, Scott reportedly made a remark to fellow state representative Judy Boyle, upon learning of her appointment to the state legislature's agriculture committee. The reported comment was that female lawmakers obtain ranking committee appointments and other leadership positions only if they "spread their legs." The alleged comment received widespread rebuke from other state lawmakers.

In the 2019 legislative session, Scott sponsored a bill that would have required Idaho's Child Protective Services to mirandize parents before assessing them or their children. After passing the House, the bill was held in committee in the Senate.

In 2019, it was reported that Scott was a member of the Coalition of Western States (COWS), a group founded by Washington state representative Matt Shea that has been accused of involvement in domestic terrorism.

In 2020, she dismissed the severity of the COVID-19 pandemic, claiming the virus was trying to kill the U.S. Constitution and "The lying, Trump-hating media who continues to push global and socialist agendas has told us that there is an emergency."

In February 2021 Scott had a Zoom meeting with constituents about gun rights, the 2021 United States Capitol attack, and free speech.

In April 2021 it was reported that Scott claimed the book To Kill a Mockingbird was an example of critical race theory in schools.
 
In 2021, Scott sought a copy of the police report accusing fellow state republican Aaron von Ehlinger of rape and asked the victim's legal representative how a person who files a false police report alleging sexual assault could be charged with a crime.

Elections

In 2020, Scott ran unopposed in the Republican primary. She defeated Gail Bolin in the general election with 68.0 percent of the vote.

In 2018, Scott defeated Mike Boeck in the Republican primary. She supported Congressman Raul Labrador for governor in the May 2018 Republican primary.

In 2016, Scott ran unopposed in the Republican primary. She defeated Kate McAlister with 62.54% of the vote. She supported Ted Cruz in the Republican Party presidential primaries, 2016.

In 2014, Scott defeated Stephen T. Snedden in the Republican primary, winning with 63.8% of the vote. She defeated Laura Bry in the general election with 66.1% of the vote.

References

External links
Heather Scott at the Idaho Legislature
Campaign site

Living people
University of Akron alumni
Republican Party members of the Idaho House of Representatives
Women state legislators in Idaho
People from Bonner County, Idaho
21st-century American politicians
Year of birth missing (living people)
21st-century American women politicians
Far-right politicians in the United States